Bakki Airport  is an airport on the southern coast of Iceland, used mainly for short-haul flights to and from the Westman Islands.

Statistics

Passengers and movements

See also 
 Transport in Iceland
 List of airports in Iceland

Notes

References

External links 
 OurAirports - Bakki
 OpenStreetMap - Bakki

Airports in Iceland